Poggio Renatico is a comune (municipality) in the Province of Ferrara in the Italian region Emilia-Romagna, located about  northeast of Bologna and about  southwest of Ferrara.  

Poggio Renatico borders on the following municipalities: Baricella, Ferrara, Galliera, Malalbergo, Terre del Reno, Vigarano Mainarda.

History 

During the Middle Ages, the region of Poggio Renatico was fortified by the rulers of Bologna through a discontinuous line of towers and castles that provided exclusive control of fishing and river trade and protection against the expansionist intentions of neighboring Ferrara.

About  outside Poggio Renatico is one of the Italian Air Force's biggest radar stations, which was formerly used to monitor air traffic over Yugoslavia and southern Warsaw Pact countries.

In 2010, NATO controlled its air forces in southern Europe from the Poggio Renatico radar base, and in March 2010 it provided military control over the airspace between the Danube delta and the Atlantic Ocean.

In May 2011, this Italian Air Force radar station was used by NATO as the nerve center for coordinating air strikes during the Libyan Civil War.

Poggio Renatico was hit by the 2012 Emilia earthquakes which caused the Lambertini Castle clock tower to collapse. The earthquake also damaged the dome and bell tower of the Abbey Church of St. Michael the Archangel. On 4 June 2012 (several weeks after the earthquake) the steeple of the church was demolished with explosives.

Main sights 
 Lambertini Castle
 Abbey of St. Michael the Archangel
 The Abbey of St. Michael the Archangel
 Tower of the Uccellino, also called the Usolino
 The Tower of the Cocenno
 The Tower of the Poggio, also called that of the Ortolano or Fornasini
 The Tower of the Verga, also called that of the Vedrega
 The Clock Tower of Poggio Renatico

Notable people
 Carlo Fornasini (1854-1931), micropalaeontologist, mayor of Poggio Renato for almost thirty years

References

External links
 Official website

Cities and towns in Emilia-Romagna